The 1978 Arkansas gubernatorial election, held on November 7, was the first time that future President Bill Clinton was elected Governor of Arkansas.

Democratic primary

At this time, one gubernatorial term was two years. Incumbent two-term Democratic Governor David Pryor decided to not seek re-election in order to run for the United States Senate, as his predecessor and future Senate colleague Dale Bumpers did.

Candidates
 Bill Clinton, Attorney General
 Frank Lady II, former State Representative and candidate for Governor in 1976
 Randall Mathis, Clark County Judge
 Monroe Schwarzlose, turkey farmer
 Joe Woodward, Seventh Circuit Prosecuting Attorney

Results
Clinton, a former assistant to U.S. Senator J. William Fulbright and since 1977 the state Attorney General, won the nomination easily.

Republican nomination

A. Lynn Lowe, a Texarkana farmer, who served as state Republican Party chairman from 1974–1980, was unopposed for the 1978 gubernatorial nomination. He had also been the Republican nominee for Arkansas's 4th congressional district seat in 1966.

Election result
Clinton easily won the general election.

Clinton also led in fundraising. His campaign budget combined $709,234.00 while Lynn's was $171,382.

Clinton, at the age of thirty-two, became the youngest Arkansas governor, the youngest governor in the United States since Harold E. Stassen won in Minnesota in 1938 at the age of thirty-one, and the youngest governor in nation at this time. In 1992 he was elected third-youngest U.S. President.

Lowe's total was the highest for a Republican nominee in Arkansas since Winthrop Rockefeller's third term bid in 1970. He carried fourteen out of seventy-five counties, including Miller, Columbia, and Union counties in South Arkansas.

References

Gubernatorial
Arkansas
1978
November 1978 events in the United States
Bill Clinton